USS Wave was a steamer acquired by the Union Navy during the American Civil War. She was used by the Union Navy as a gunboat in support of the Union Navy blockade of Confederate waterways until she was herself captured by Confederate forces.

Argosy No. 2 constructed in Pennsylvania, renamed Wave 

Argosy No. 2, a sidewheel steamboat built in 1863 at Monongahela, Pennsylvania, was acquired by the Navy on 14 November 1863, renamed Wave, and converted to a "tinclad" gunboat.

Assigned to the West Gulf Blockade 

Early in 1864, she was assigned to the West Gulf Blockading Squadron and took up her initial station off New Orleans, Louisiana.

Participating in the Calcasieu River expedition 

On 15 April, she received orders to shift to Calcasieu Pass at the mouth of the Calcasieu River in southwestern Louisiana.

Under attack, Wave and Granite City captured by Confederates 

At daybreak on 6 May, while riding at anchor in the river, the two ships were surprised by the entire Sabine Pass garrison. Granite City surrendered about 45 minutes later, but Wave fought on for another 45 minutes until, her engines and moveable guns disabled and eight of her crew wounded, she found herself unable to continue the struggle. Accordingly, her crew destroyed documents and materiel on board, and her commanding officer surrendered Wave to the Southerners.

In service as a cargo ship by the Confederates 

The Confederates employed the vessel as a cargo steamer. Her ultimate disposition is unknown, but she was probably destroyed by retreating Confederate forces.

See also

Confederate States Navy

References 
 Union service
 Confederate service

Ships of the Union Navy
Ships built in Monongahela, Pennsylvania
Steamships of the United States Navy
Gunboats of the United States Navy
American Civil War patrol vessels of the United States
Shipwrecks of the American Civil War
1863 ships